Jakob Sõnajalg (3 November 1887 Mäo Parish (now part of Paide), Kreis Jerwen - 4 May 1947 Paide) was an Estonian politician. He was a member of the Estonian Constituent Assembly, representing the Estonian Labour Party and of the V Riigikogu, representing the National Centre Party. He was a member of the assembly since 7 October 1919. He replaced Johannes Lehtman.

References

1887 births
1947 deaths
People from Paide
People from Kreis Jerwen
Estonian Labour Party politicians
National Centre Party (Estonia) politicians
Members of the Estonian Constituent Assembly
Members of the Riigikogu, 1932–1934
Estonian military personnel of the Estonian War of Independence